Sarajevo Poetry Days is an international literary festival held annually in Sarajevo, Bosnia and Herzegovina. It was established in 1962 by Bosnian poet and academic, Izet Sarajlić, who was then-chairman of the Association of Bosnian Writers. The festival is the oldest living literary festival in Bosnia and Herzegovina.

References

External links
Official Website

Tourist attractions in Sarajevo
Poetry festivals in Europe
Festivals in Sarajevo
Festivals in Yugoslavia
Annual events in Bosnia and Herzegovina
1962 establishments in Yugoslavia